Mattole, or Mattole–Bear River, is an extinct Athabaskan language once spoken by the Mattole and Bear River peoples of northern California. It is one of the four languages belonging to the California Athabaskan cluster of the Pacific Coast Athabaskan languages. It was found in two locations: in the valley of the Mattole River, immediately south of  Cape Mendocino on the coast of northwest California, and a distinct dialect on Bear River, about 10 miles to the north.

References

 Goddard, Pliny Earle (1929). "The Bear River Dialect of Athapascan." University of California Publications in American Archaeology and Ethnology 24 (5):291-334, 1929.
 Golla, Victor (2011). California Indian Languages. Berkeley: University of California Press. .
 
 Yeadon, David, "California’s North Face", National Geographic, vol. 184, no. 1, p. 48-79, July 1993.

External links
 A Survey of the Athabaskan Language Mattole
 Mattole language overview at the Survey of California and Other Indian Languages
 Mattole at native-languages.org
 Mattole, World Atlas of Language Structures Online
 OLAC resources in and about the Mattole language
 Mattole basic lexicon at the Global Lexicostatistical Database
 "It is the desire of the Live Your Language Alliance to hear and speak the traditional languages of the Tolowa, Karuk, Yurok, Hupa, Tsnungwe, Wiyot, Mattole, and Wailaki."

Indigenous languages of California
Pacific Coast Athabaskan languages
Mattole people
Extinct languages of North America